Dodecosini is a tribe of beetles in the subfamily Cerambycinae, containing the following genera and species:

 Genus Diringsiella
 Diringsiella femoralis Martins & Galileo, 1991
 Genus Dodecosis
 Dodecosis nigricornis Martins & Galileo, 1991
 Dodecosis saperdina Bates, 1867
 Genus Monneella
 Monneella bicolor Martins, 1985
 Genus Olexandrella
 Olexandrella frederici Dalens, Giuglaris & Tavakilian, 2010
 Olexandrella rafaeli Galileo & Martins, 2011
 Olexandrella serotina Zajciw, 1959

References

 
Cerambycinae